The following table shows the world record progression in the women's indoor 60 metres, as recognised by the IAAF.

The IAAF have officially ratified world indoor records since 1 January 1987. Previous to this, they were regarded as world indoor bests. As such, the existing world indoor best, Nelli Cooman's 7.00 secs, was deemed to be the inaugural world indoor record.

World record progression (1966-)

Notes

References

60 metres
world record